Udea auratalis is a moth in the family Crambidae. It was described by Warren in 1895. It is found in Japan and China. They are predominantly from Eurasia and the New World.

References

Moths described in 1895
auratalis